Bryce Robert Meredith (born April 30, 1995) is an American professional mixed martial artist, former freestyle and graduated folkstyle wrestler who currently competes in the bantamweight division of Bellator MMA. In college, where he competed at 141 pounds, he was a three–time NCAA Division I All–American and the 2018 Big 12 Conference champion out of the University of Wyoming.

Wrestling career

High school 
Meredith attended Cheyenne Central High School in the state of Wyoming. He went on to become a four–time state (WHSAA) champion with a record of 123 wins and 8 defeats. He was also a four–time NHSCA All–American and was ranked amongst the top–100 recruits in the country.

University

NC State 
Meredith then committed to North Carolina State University as a class of 2014 recruit. He competed for just one season as a Wolfpack at 133 pounds ('14-'15) and compiled 15 wins and 6 losses during regular season, but was not on the starting lineup for the NCAA championships.

University of Wyoming 
After just one year attending NCSU, he transferred to his home state, Wyoming. His coaches from both universities explain that Meredith was feeling homesick and it was affecting him and his performance.

As a sophomore ('15-'16), he quickly made a difference from last year, going up in the rankings from #31 to #5, finishing the season with 29 wins and 5 losses and winning a bronze medal at the Big 12 Conference. Despite his accomplishments during regular season, Meredith was an underdog at the NCAA tournament. As the fourteenth seed, he went on to defeat the second, third and sixth seeds to make it to the finals, where he faced the top–seed and eventual two–time NCAA champion Dean Heil and lost by points. This marked Meredith in the history of the program as the first finalist since 1996.

As a junior ('16-'17), he opened up the season with a Northern Colorado Open title and compiled a dual-meet record of 11–3. In the post-season, he made the finals of the Big 12s where he faced Dean Heil, whom he had lost to at last year's NCAA finals. He was once again defeated on points, earning runner–up honors and an automatic qualification ticket for the NCAAs. At the tournament, he was the number ten seed and as such, he defeated three opponents including the second seed before falling to the sixth seeded wrestler in the semifinals. Due to his last match's result, he was thrown to the semifinals of the consolation bracket, where he defeated Jaydin Eierman to make it to the bronze medal match, where he was pinned by the second seed, whom he had beaten before, placing fourth.

Meredith had his most successful season as a senior ('17–'18). He opened up with a victory over ninth–ranked Chad Red from Nebraska and then went on to compete at the Cliff Keen Invitational, where he lost to two–time Cadet World Champion and fifth seed Yianni Diakomihalis in the semifinals and placed third. He then dominated the rest of the regular season, claiming an RTOC title (named Outstanding Wrestler) and posting a 16–0 record at duals, with notable wins over top–ranked Seth Gross, second–ranked Jaydin Eierman and two–time defending NCAA champion Dean Heil. In the post–season, he once again defeated Heil in the Big 12 finals to claim his first title of the tournament. He entered the NCAA championships as the top–seed and defeated three unseeded opponents until the semifinals, where he defeated Joey McKenna to reach the finale. He lost his final match against Yianni Diakomihalis, the only man to beat Meredith as a senior. Overall, Meredith became a two–time NCAA finalist, three–time All-American and a Big 12 champion with a record of 108 wins and 21 losses.

Freestyle

2018–2019 
Meredith made his senior level debut in Russia in December 2018 at the prestigious Alans International, where he lost his only match. A month later (January 2019), he competed at the Dave Schultz Memorial International and claimed a bronze medal, after losing his semifinal match and defeating two other wrestlers in the consolation bracket. He then made an appearance at the US Open in April, where he went 2–2 and did not place. After his performance at the US Open, he attended the Last Chance Qualifier for the World Team Trials In an attempt to make the team, but was stopped by Dean Heil. Seven months later, he competed at the Bill Farrell International, failing to place.

In his last tournament of the year, Meredith went on to compete at the US Nationals of December, where he performed outstandingly in comparison to his last appearances. He opened up by tech'ing multiple–time age–group national champion Josh Saunders and once again two–time NCAA champion Dean Heil before being stopped himself by eventual winner of the tournament Jordan Oliver. He then continued to tech his competition in the consolation bracket, once again defeating Saunders and also three–time All-American Ethan Lizak before being defeated himself by two–time Cadet World Champion and reigning NCAA champion Yianni Diakomihalis. He was defeated again by Olympian Frank Molinaro in a close 6–7 decision to place sixth, failing to qualify for the 2020 US Olympic Team Trials.

2020 
Meredith travelled to Cuba to attend the Granma y Cerro Pelado International in February. He started up with a win but went on to lose his next two matches before winning the bronze–medal match.

After being unable to compete due to the COVID-19 pandemic until October, Meredith downed recently graduated high schooler Beau Bartlett on October 20 at the NLWC II on points in a high–pace and close match (8–6) and Iowa standout Austin DeSanto on November 1 at the HWC Showdown Open, by points (11–3). On November 24 at the WRTC Underground I, Meredith was defeated in a frenetic and close match by NCAA champion Seth Gross, seven points to ten. He then competed at the Flo 8-Man Challenge: 150 lbs on December 18, where he was eliminated in the first round by World Championship runner–up (70kg) James Green.

Mixed martial arts career

Early career 
After graduating from the University of Wyoming, Meredith announced his intentions of competing in mixed martial arts. Meredith made his professional debut on May 21, 2021, at LFA 108, in a bantamweight bout against Steven Merrill, where despite facing early adversity by being dropped, he was able to pound his way into a technical knockout victory in the first round.

In his sophomore performance on April 8, 2022 at LFA 128, Meredith defeated Jay Viola via technical knockout in the third round.

Meredith faced Nathan Fought on September 9, 2022 at LFA 141, defeating him via rear-naked choke in the first round.

Bellator MMA 
On February 14, 2023, it was announced that Meredith had signed a multi-fight deal with Bellator MMA and would make his debut on March 31, 2023 at Bellator 293 against Brandon Carrillo.

Mixed martial arts record 
 

|-
|Win
|align=center|3–0
|Nathan Fought
|Submission (rear-naked choke)
|LFA 141
|
|align=center|1
|align=center|4:36
|Vail, Colorado, United States
|
|-
|Win
|align=center|2–0
|Jay Viola
|TKO (punches)
|LFA 128
|
|align=center|3
|align=center|1:04
|Sioux Falls, South Dakota, United States
|
|-
|Win
|align=center|1–0
|Steven Merrill
|TKO (punches)
|LFA 108
|
|align=center|1
|align=center|3:55
|Sioux Falls, South Dakota, United States
|

Freestyle record 

! colspan="7"| Senior Freestyle Matches
|-
!  Res.
!  Record
!  Opponent
!  Score
!  Date
!  Event
!  Location
|-
! style=background:white colspan=7 |
|-
|Loss
|18–14
|align=left| James Green
|style="font-size:88%"|TF 0–10
|style="font-size:88%" |December 18, 2020
|style="font-size:88%" |Flo 8-Man Challenge: 150 lbs
|style="text-align:left;font-size:88%;" |
 Austin, Texas
|-
|Loss
|18–13
|align=left| Seth Gross
|style="font-size:88%"|7–10
|style="font-size:88%"|November 24, 2020
|style="font-size:88%"|WRTC Underground I
|style="text-align:left;font-size:88%;"|
 Madison, Wisconsin
|-
|Win
|18–12
|align=left| Austin DeSanto
|style="font-size:88%"|11–3
|style="font-size:88%"|November 1, 2020
|style="font-size:88%"|HWC Showdown Open
|style="text-align:left;font-size:88%;"|
 Iowa City, Iowa
|-
|Win
|17–12
|align=left| Beau Bartlett
|style="font-size:88%"|8–6
|style="font-size:88%"|October 20, 2020
|style="font-size:88%"|NLWC II
|style="text-align:left;font-size:88%;"|
 State College, Pennsylvania
|-
! style=background:white colspan=7 |
|-
|Win
|16–12
|align=left|
|style="font-size:88%"|
|style="font-size:88%" rowspan=4|February 9–17, 2020
|style="font-size:88%" rowspan=4|2020 Granma y Cerro Pelado 
|style="text-align:left;font-size:88%;" rowspan=4|
 Havana, Cuba
|-
|Loss
|15–12
|align=left| Cristian Solenzal
|style="font-size:88%"|TF 0–11
|-
|Loss
|15–11
|align=left| Alejandro Valdés
|style="font-size:88%"|TF 0–10
|-
|Win
|15–10
|align=left| Hernandez
|style="font-size:88%"|4–0
|-
! style=background:white colspan=7 |
|-
|Loss
|14–10
|align=left| Frank Molinaro
|style="font-size:88%"|6–7
|style="font-size:88%" rowspan=7|December 20–22, 2019
|style="font-size:88%" rowspan=7|2019 US Senior Nationals - US Olympic Trials Qualifier
|style="text-align:left;font-size:88%;" rowspan=7|
 Fort Worth, Texas
|-
|Loss
|14–9
|align=left| Yianni Diakomihalis
|style="font-size:88%"|TF 0–10
|-
|Win
|14–8
|align=left| Josh Saunders
|style="font-size:88%"|TF 16–6
|-
|Win
|13–8
|align=left| Ethan Lizak
|style="font-size:88%"|TF 10–0
|-
|Loss
|12–8
|align=left| Jordan Oliver
|style="font-size:88%"|TF 0–10
|-
|Win
|12–7
|align=left| Dean Heil
|style="font-size:88%"|TF 18–8
|-
|Win
|11–7
|align=left| Josh Saunders
|style="font-size:88%"|TF 11–1
|-
! style=background:white colspan=7 |
|-
|Loss
|10–7
|align=left| Evan Henderson
|style="font-size:88%"|TF 0–10
|style="font-size:88%" rowspan=5|November 15–16, 2019
|style="font-size:88%" rowspan=5|2019 Bill Farrell Memorial International Open
|style="text-align:left;font-size:88%;" rowspan=5|
 New York City, New York
|-
|Win
|10–6
|align=left| Dean Heil
|style="font-size:88%"|TF 18–7
|-
|Loss
|9–6
|align=left| Jordan Oliver
|style="font-size:88%"|TF 0–11
|-
|Win
|9–5
|align=left| Earl Hall
|style="font-size:88%"|TF 13–3
|-
|Win
|8–5
|align=left| Rob Mathers
|style="font-size:88%"|Fall
|-
! style=background:white colspan=7 |
|-
|Loss
|7–5
|align=left| Dean Heil
|style="font-size:88%"|TF 0–10
|style="font-size:88%" rowspan=2|May 5, 2019
|style="font-size:88%" rowspan=2|2019 US Last Chance World Team Trials Qualifier
|style="text-align:left;font-size:88%;" rowspan=2|
 East Stroudsburg, Pennsylvania
|-
|Win
|7–4
|align=left| Ben Whitford
|style="font-size:88%"|7–6
|-
! style=background:white colspan=7 |
|-
|Loss
|6–4
|align=left| Joey McKenna
|style="font-size:88%"|TF 0–10
|style="font-size:88%" rowspan=4|April 24–27, 2019
|style="font-size:88%" rowspan=4|2019 US Open National Championships
|style="text-align:left;font-size:88%;" rowspan=4|
 Las Vegas, Nevada
|-
|Win
|6–3
|align=left| Montell Marion
|style="font-size:88%"|9–4
|-
|Loss
|5–3
|align=left| Jaydin Eierman
|style="font-size:88%"|Fall
|-
|Win
|5–2
|align=left| Josh Finesilver
|style="font-size:88%"|TF 10–0
|-
! style=background:white colspan=7 | 
|-
|Win
|4–2
|align=left| Andrew Alirez
|style="font-size:88%"|7–2
|style="font-size:88%" rowspan=5|January 24–26, 2019 
|style="font-size:88%" rowspan=5|2019 Dave Schultz Memorial International
|style="text-align:left;font-size:88%;" rowspan=5|
 Colorado Springs, Colorado
|-
|Win
|3–2
|align=left| Brandon Wright 
|style="font-size:88%"|6–4
|-
|Loss
|2–2
|align=left| Bernard Futrell
|style="font-size:88%"|TF 1–12
|-
|Win
|2–1
|align=left| Andrew Alirez
|style="font-size:88%"|8–7
|-
|Win
|1–1
|align=left| Joshua Dziewa
|style="font-size:88%"|TF 13–2
|-
! style=background:white colspan=7 | 
|-
|Loss
|0–1
|align=left| Imam Adzhiev
|style="font-size:88%"|TF 0–10
|style="font-size:88%"|December 7–9, 2018
|style="font-size:88%"|2018 Alans International
|style="text-align:left;font-size:88%;" |
 Vladikavkaz, Russia
|-

NCAA record 

! colspan="8"| NCAA Championships Matches
|-
!  Res.
!  Record
!  Opponent
!  Score
!  Date
!  Event
|-
! style=background:white colspan=6 | 2018 NCAA Championships  at 141 lbs
|-
|Loss
|12–4
|align=left|Yianni Diakomihalis
|style="font-size:88%"|4–7
|style="font-size:88%" rowspan=5|March 15–17, 2018
|style="font-size:88%" rowspan=5|2018 NCAA Division I Wrestling Championships
|-
|Win
|12–3
|align=left|Joey McKenna 
|style="font-size:88%"|1–0
|-
|Win
|11–3
|align=left|Sa`Derian Perry
|style="font-size:88%"|Fall
|-
|Win
|10–3
|align=left|Vincent Turk
|style="font-size:88%"|5–2
|-
|Win
|9–3
|align=left|Colton Schilling
|style="font-size:88%"|5–1
|-
! style=background:white colspan=6 |2017 NCAA Championships 4th at 141 lbs
|-
|Loss
|8–3
|align=left| Kevin Jack
|style="font-size:88%"|Fall
|style="font-size:88%" rowspan=6|March 16–18, 2017
|style="font-size:88%" rowspan=6|2017 NCAA Division I Wrestling Championships
|-
|Win
|8–2
|align=left|Jaydin Eierman
|style="font-size:88%"|8-–
|-
|Loss
|7–2
|align=left|George DiCamillo
|style="font-size:88%"|7–10
|-
|Win
|7–1
|align=left|Kevin Jack
|style="font-size:88%"|6–5
|-
|Win
|6–1
|align=left|Johnathan Hathaway
|style="font-size:88%"|MD 8–0
|-
|Win
|5–1
|align=left|Mike Longo
|style="font-size:88%"|MD 12–4
|-
! style=background:white colspan=6 |2016 NCAA Championships  at 141 lbs
|-
|Loss
|4–1
|align=left|Dean Heil
|style="font-size:88%"|2–3
|style="font-size:88%" rowspan=5|March 17–19, 2016
|style="font-size:88%" rowspan=5|2016 NCAA Division I Wrestling Championships
|-
|Win
|4–0
|align=left|Joey McKenna
|style="font-size:88%"|5–3
|-
|Win
|3–0
|align=left|Micah Jordan
|style="font-size:88%"|5–2
|-
|Win
|2–0
|align=left|Kevin Jack
|style="font-size:88%"|5–4
|-
|Win
|1–0
|align=left|Robert Mathers
|style="font-size:88%"|MD 16–3
|-

Stats 

!  Season
!  Year
!  School
!  Rank
!  Weigh Class
!  Record
!  Win
!  Bonus
|-
|2018
|Senior
|rowspan=3|University of Wyoming
|#1 (2nd)
|rowspan=3|141
|33–2
|94.29%
|51.43%
|-
|2017
|Junior
|#10 (4th)
|31–8
|79.49%
|58.97%
|-
|2016
|Sophomore
|#14 (2nd)
|29–5
|85.29%
|47.06%
|-
|2015
|Freshman
|North Carolina State University
|#31 (DNQ)
|133
|15–6
|71.43%
|38-10%
|-
|colspan=5 bgcolor="LIGHTGREY"|Career
|bgcolor="LIGHTGREY"|108–21
|bgcolor="LIGHTGREY"|83.72%
|bgcolor="LIGHTGREY"|50.39%

See also 

 List of current Bellator MMA fighters
 List of male mixed martial artists

References

External links 
 

Living people
1995 births
American male sport wrestlers
Sportspeople from Wyoming
Amateur wrestlers
University of Wyoming alumni
American male mixed martial artists
Mixed martial artists from Wyoming
People from Cheyenne, Wyoming
Bantamweight mixed martial artists
Mixed martial artists utilizing collegiate wrestling
Mixed martial artists utilizing freestyle wrestling